12-12-1950 is a 2017 Indian Tamil language film written and directed by Selva, who starred as the lead role in the film. The movie is a tribute to the film actor Rajinikanth, and the title of the film corresponds to his birthday (December 12, 1950).

The cast, apart from starring Selva, includes Ramesh Thilak, Adhavan, Ajai Prasad, Prashanth, Ashwini Chandrasekhar, Thambi Ramaiah, Yogi Babu, John Vijay, and M. S. Bhaskar. Selva has rechristened himself as Kabali Selva. The title teaser of the movie was released on 8 July 2017, and the film released on 8 December 2017.

Plot
The movie follows the lives of five Rajinikanth fans.

Cast

Selva as Kabali Selva
Ramesh Thilak as Muthu
Adhavan as Ejamaan
Ajai Prasad as Billa
Prashanth Kirubakaran as Veera
Ashwini Chandrasekhar as Kumudhavalli, Selva's wife
Yogi Babu as Singam
Thambi Ramaiah as Vanangamudi
M. S. Bhaskar as Kumudhavalli's father
John Vijay as John Vijay
Elango Kumaravel as Jail Warden
Ponnambalam as Police Inspector
Swaminathan as Kunjithapatham
Delhi Ganesh
Shafi
E. Ramdoss
Risha as Sarasu
Nandha Saravanan
Cheran Raj

Production

Soundtrack 
Music by Adithyha - Soorya.
"Thedi Pudicha" - Nincy Vincent
"Nadhi Therikuthe" -  Pratap Prb
"Thooya Megam" - Nincy Vincent

Release 
The film's title 12-12-1950 meant that the film didn't have any problems with title changes during release. Other films that depicted Rajinikanth faced issues as those films explicitly stated Rajinikanth's name such as Main Hoon Rajinikanth and Perumaan The Rajinikanth.

Reception 
Maalaimalar called the film "festive". Film portal nettv4u wrote that "12-12-1950 is not a bad film but doesn’t impress the viewers". Chennai Vision called the film's theme a positive and negative aspect.

References

External links
 

2010s Tamil-language films
2017 films
Indian comedy films
2017 comedy films